Walter Emanuel Jones (born November 30, 1970) is an American actor, martial artist and dancer, known for playing the role of Zack Taylor, the original Black Ranger on the hit television series Mighty Morphin Power Rangers.

He also appeared in successful television shows including Family Matters, Step by Step, Sabrina, the Teenage Witch, Moesha,  Buffy the Vampire Slayer, Early Edition, NYPD Blue, CSI: Crime Scene Investigation, Off Centre and The Shield.

He played in movies including Backyard Dogs (2000), House of the Dead 2 (2005), and Popstar: Never Stop Never Stopping (2016).

He gave his voice talent to animated movies including Open Season 2 (2008) and Cloudy with a Chance of Meatballs 2 (2013).

Life and career
Jones was born and raised in Detroit. He lost the middle finger on his left hand at the age of 4. He began his career by an uncredited role in the successful TV show Beverly Hills, 90210. In 1992, he took part in the Malcolm X movie.

Jones played the character of Zack Taylor, the original "Black Power Ranger" in the Power Rangers series. He was written out of the series midway through the second season, after a contract and pay dispute, and was replaced by Johnny Yong Bosch as the Black Ranger. Jones returned to Power Rangers in the Lost Galaxy season (1999) where he played the voice of Hexuba's Nightmare Monster in the episode "Dream Battle"; he also acted in an episode of Power Rangers: Wild Force (2002) entitled Forever Red in which many previous Red Rangers teamed up. Again, he did not appear as his original character, Zack, but rather provided the voice for one of the antagonists, a general in the Machine Empire named Gerrok. He was also one of the special commentators, along with fellow co-star Amy Jo Johnson, on the "1993" episode of I Love the '90s. He also reunited with Austin St. John (with whom he formed a close friendship during their time together on the show) as co-host for a special airing of the original pilot episode of Power Rangers called "The Lost Episode". In 2023, he will reprise the role of Zack Taylor for the first time since leaving the show in 1994 in the Netflix special, "Mighty Morphin Power Rangers: Once & Always", which will celebrate the 30th anniversary of the Power Rangers franchise.

Jones was the very first actor to do voicework for any character other than a Ranger (mainly for monsters or villains) on a Power Rangers show after having a role as a Ranger himself. Other former Rangers who would do voicework after Jones included Archie Kao, Catherine Sutherland, Jason Faunt, Valerie Vernon, Sean Cw Johnson and Johnny Yong Bosch.

Jones was a lead character in the teen drama Malibu Shores playing "Mouse". Jones also had major roles in the independent movie The Dogwalker. He has appeared in other well-known productions, including a small part in Buffy the Vampire Slayer in the season 4 episode "Fear, Itself" and the Disney Channel Original Movie, Brink!. He also appeared as Harlan Band in the Nickelodeon series Space Cases, his second role as a main character and as a teenager. He guest starred in an episode of Family Matters as Kissel, and portrayed a supporting character in the first season of The Shield named Rondell Robinson, a drug dealer. He had a small role in the film Suckers in which he played a character named Clay. He also appeared in many successful TV shows including Family Matters, Step by Step, Sabrina, the Teenage Witch, Moesha, Early Edition, NYPD Blue, CSI: Crime Scene Investigation and Off Centre. Additionally, he played a small role in the film House of the Dead 2 as "locker zombie". Jones also had a cameo appearance in the movie The Fast and the Furious: Tokyo Drift.

Jones also had a major role in the backyard wrestling movie Backyard Dogs, which spent time as the lowest-rated movie on the Internet Movie Database.  As of July 2007, it is no longer on the list as it was straight-to-video. Jones voiced characters in the successful animated movies Open Season 2 (2008) and Cloudy with a Chance of Meatballs 2 (2013).

He appeared briefly as a salsa dance instructor on Age of Love. He also appeared in Mighty Med and as a poet in an episode of Disney XD's Pair of Kings. Additionally Jones has also been featured in a PetSmart commercial and a Bank of America commercial as well. In 2002, he appeared in the movie Love and a Bullet. In 2016, he appeared in the movie Popstar: Never Stop Never Stopping and the short movie Star Trek : Captain Pike.

In January 2019, he starred in The Order alongside Austin St. John, Catherine Sutherland, David Yost, Johnny Yong Bosch, Paul Schrier, Karan Ashley, Steve Cardenas, Erin Cahill, Blake Foster, Nakia Burrise, Hilary Shepard Turner, Dan Southworth, Alyson Sullivan, Deborah Estelle Phillips and Azim Rizk.

Filmography

References

External links

Walter Emanuel Jones on Myspace

Actors from Detroit
African-American male actors
African-American male dancers
African-American dancers
American male dancers
American male film actors
American male television actors
American male video game actors
American male voice actors
American martial artists
Living people
People from Chula Vista, California
United States International University alumni
21st-century African-American people
20th-century African-American people
1970 births